The Honda CL125 was a scrambler motorcycle made by Honda from 1967 to 1974.  Two different engines were used through the models life: 1967-1969: CL125A 124cc 2 cylinder 4-stroke, 1973-1974: CL125S 122cc 1 cylinder 4-stroke.

The CL125A was produced from 1967 to 1969 with a 124 cc 4-stroke engine and four-speed transmission.  It was the smallest OHC twin cylinder four-stroke that Honda made, and was the smaller sibling to the 160, 175, 350 & 450 models.

In 1970, Honda released its venerable, light weight, 99 cc OHC single 2-valve upright engine. This was a direct challenge to the off-road market which was, at this time, dominated by the two-strokes. A sea wave of change was to quickly follow many of its CB, CL and SL based models.

In 1973, the first CL125S was manufactured using this new motor in its design, with a larger 122 cc piston (which produced more low-end torque but little gain in power) and a slightly larger piston/rod connecting pin. This motorcycle was almost identical to the 1970 to 1973 CL100, that was really only a slight modification of the CB series produced at the same time. The modifications included; lower rear sprocket gearing, slightly more aggressive tires, shorter front fender, braced handlebar, high mount exhaust system and elimination of both the tachometer and center stand.

CL125
Dual-sport motorcycles